Antonie Eugenie Yvonne Straeteman (17 July 1907 – 31 January 1998) was a French gymnast. She competed in the women's artistic team all-around event at the 1928 Summer Olympics.

References

External links
 

1907 births
1998 deaths
French female artistic gymnasts
Olympic gymnasts of France
Gymnasts at the 1928 Summer Olympics
20th-century French women
Sportspeople from Roubaix